Iceland competed at the 2012 Summer Olympics in London, from 27 July to 12 August 2012. The nation celebrated its centennial anniversary in the Olympics, having participated at every games since 1912, except for four occasions.

The National Olympic and Sports Association of Iceland sent the nation's third largest delegation to the Games, with a total of 28 athletes, 22 men and 6 women, to compete in 6 sports, including men's handball, the nation's only team-based sport at these Olympic games. Javelin thrower and Olympic hopeful Ásdís Hjálmsdóttir was Iceland's first female flag bearer at the opening ceremony since 2000.

Iceland, however, failed to win a single Olympic medal in London, after the men's national handball team, silver medalists from Beijing, lost to Hungary in the quarterfinal round. Meanwhile, Hjálmsdóttir, who qualified for the final rounds of the women's javelin throw event, finished farther from the standings.

Athletics

Icelandic athletes participated in the following events:

Men
Track & road events

Field events

Women
Field events

Badminton

Iceland qualified one athlete in badminton.

Handball

 Men's team event – 1 team of 15 players

Men's tournament

Group play

Quarter-final

Judo

Iceland qualified 1 judoka.

Shooting

Men

Swimming

Iceland qualified the following swimmers:

Men

Women

* Lost swim-off

See also
Iceland at the 2012 Winter Youth Olympics

References

Nations at the 2012 Summer Olympics
2012
Summer Olympics